The 1955–56 Bradford City A.F.C. season was the 43rd in the club's history.

The club finished 8th in Division Three North, and reached the 2nd round of the FA Cup.

Sources

References

Bradford City A.F.C. seasons
Bradford City